The Battle of San Mateo was a battle during the Philippine–American War between the United States and the Philippines. It was fought on December 19, 1899, near San Mateo in what was then Manila province (now a part of Rizal) between the forces of General Henry Ware Lawton, and General Licerio Gerónimo's Morong Command battalion and the Tiradores de la Muerte.  Lawton was killed in the battle, making him the highest-ranking American commander to die in the Philippine conflict.

On December 18, Lawton and his men were en route to San Mateo along the Marikina River in a punitive expedition against Brig. Gen. Pio del Pilar's 1,000 force, which threatened the Marikina waterworks and the Manila wagon road to the north. Lawton's force included Col. James R. Lockett's squadron of the 11th Volunteer Cavalry and Lt. Col. H.H. Sargent's 29th Battalion. A monsoon flooded the river and muddied the trail.

Battle
On December 19, the 11th captured Montalban, while Sargent's squadron made for San Mateo, approaching the Filipinos in rain and mist. The Filipinos forced Lawton's troops to scramble for cover in the rice fields.

Lawton walked up and down the line in a white rain coat and pith helmet, rallying his men even after his aide was struck. Lawton died from a bullet to the chest from a Filipino sniper by the name of Bonifacio Mariano.

Sargent located a ford allowing his men to cross the river and drove the defenders from San Mateo.

Aftermath
The death of General Lawton proved to be a terrible blow to his soldiers' morale and the U.S. public. Lawton's body was taken to Manila's Paco Park.

Before his death, Lawton had written about the Filipinos in a formal correspondence, "Taking into account the disadvantages they have to fight against in terms of arms, equipment and military discipline, without artillery, short of ammunition, powder inferior, shells reloaded until they are defective, they are the bravest men I have ever seen ..."

Gallery

References

Paye
1899 in the Philippines
Paye
History of Rizal
Paye
December 1899 events